Sagene is a village in Arendal municipality in Agder county, Norway. The lake Langangsvannet lies just east of the village.

References

Villages in Agder
Arendal